Joseph-Georges Caron (December 4, 1896 – January 15, 1956) was a Canadian provincial politician.

Born in Maisonneuve (Montreal), Quebec, Caron was the member of the Legislative Assembly of Quebec for Maisonneuve from 1939 to 1944.

References

1896 births
1956 deaths
Politicians from Montreal
Quebec Liberal Party MNAs